The News Courier is a daily newspaper published in Athens, Alabama, covering Limestone County, Alabama. It is owned by Community Newspaper Holdings Inc.

Today's News Courier was created in 1969, when The Alabama Courier (founded 1892) and the Limestone Democrat (founded 1891) were acquired by Robert Bryan and merged. The combined paper was known in the 1980s as The Athens LC News Courier. Bryan sold his papers to Hollinger in 1997. When Hollinger dispersed of most of its papers, The News Courier was acquired by Community Newspaper Holdings, now known as CNHI, LLC.

The News Courier was a daily newspaper through the early 2010s, then reduced to six print editions per week. In April 2020, amid severe downturns in advertising revenue due to the COVID-19 pandemic, CNHI reduced the print-edition schedule to Tuesdays, Wednesdays, Thursdays and Saturdays.

Awards

2018 Better Newspaper Contest - Alabama Press Association

References

External links 
 The News Courier Website
 CNHI Website

Newspapers published in Alabama
Limestone County, Alabama
Daily newspapers published in the United States